Stephen Thomas Bilko (November 13, 1928 – March 7, 1978) was an American professional baseball player known for his home run hitting as a minor leaguer during the 1950s. He was 20 years old when he broke into Major League Baseball on September 22, 1949, with the St. Louis Cardinals.

Nat Hiken, creator of The Phil Silvers Show, supposedly took the name of the character Sgt. Bilko from the ballplayer, whose long-ball heroics for one of Los Angeles' two minor-league teams of the mid-1950s made him a local celebrity.

Biography
Bilko was born in Nanticoke, Pennsylvania, in coal mining country, and made his debut with the Allentown Cardinals in 1945 at the age of 16 during the final year of World War II.

A first baseman, Bilko enjoyed his greatest fame with the Los Angeles Angels of the Pacific Coast League from 1955–1957, when he won three consecutive PCL Most Valuable Player awards and home run titles. His greatest year came in 1956, when he won the PCL Triple Crown with a .360 batting average, 55 home runs and 164 runs batted in; he also led the league in runs scored (163) and hits (215). His Triple Crown year came for a pennant-winning Angels' team that won 107 games, and was sandwiched in between seasons in which Bilko belted 37 (1955) and 56 (1957) long balls. He was posthumously inducted into the Pacific Coast League Hall of Fame in 2003.

In addition to the Cardinals (–), Bilko also appeared in the majors for the Chicago Cubs (1954), Cincinnati Redlegs, Los Angeles Dodgers (1958), Detroit Tigers and the American League's Los Angeles Angels (–), but he never enjoyed the phenomenal success he had with the PCL Angels in the 1950s. Still, it was his most productive big-league season. As an original member of the American League Angels, an expansion team, he became the first player to appear for each of Los Angeles' MLB teams. Playing in his old minor-league haven, Los Angeles' Wrigley Field, Bilko responded with his second-best MLB campaign with 20 homers and 59 RBI in 1961.

In 600 games over ten major-league seasons, Bilko posted a .249 batting average (432-for-1,738) with 220 runs, 76 home runs, 276 RBI, 234 bases on balls and a .444 slugging percentage. Defensively, he recorded a .992 fielding percentage as a first baseman.

During his stay with the 1954 Cubs, announcer Bert Wilson placed Bilko at the end of what he hoped would be a soon-to-be-famous double play combination of Ernie Banks, Gene Baker and Bilko. His fanciful name for that trio was "Bingo to Bango to Bilko".  However, Bilko got into only 47 games with the Wrigleys (only 22 of them at first base) before he was sent at season's end to the PCL Angels, the Cubs' top minor league affiliate, where he would become a legend.

Bilko was inducted into the Baseball Reliquary's Shrine of the Eternals in 2015.

Personal life
His granddaughter, Barbara Bilko, was a goaltender in ice hockey for the Ohio State Buckeyes from 2008–09 through 2010–2011.

References

External links

Obituary, from The Deadball Era
The Bilko Athletic Club: The Story of the 1956 Los Angeles Angels
Corbett, Warren, Steve Bilko, Society for American Baseball Research Biography Project
Chronology, Facts, and Stats from This Day In Baseball

1928 births
1978 deaths
Allentown Cardinals players
American expatriate baseball players in Cuba
American expatriate baseball players in the Dominican Republic
American expatriate baseball players in Panama
Baseball players from Pennsylvania
Chicago Cubs players
Cincinnati Redlegs players
Columbus Red Birds players
Detroit Tigers players
Los Angeles Angels (minor league) players
Los Angeles Angels players
Los Angeles Dodgers players
Lynchburg Cardinals players
Major League Baseball first basemen
Pacific Coast League MVP award winners
People from Nanticoke, Pennsylvania
Rochester Red Wings players
St. Louis Cardinals players
Salisbury Cardinals players
Spokane Indians players
Winston-Salem Cardinals players